Everybody Get Up may refer to:

 "Everybody Get Up" (Five song), 1998
 "Everybody Get Up" (Pitbull song), 2005